Nathan Bondswell (born 10 February 1997) is an English footballer.

Career
Bondswell began his career at Derby County's youth academy before he moved to North Lancashire, and enrolled at the Lancaster & Morecambe College in 2013. He began playing reserve team football with Morecambe and signed a professional contract with the club in November 2014. He made his professional debut on 1 September 2015 in a 2–0 victory over Walsall in the Football League Trophy.

References

External links

1997 births
Living people
English footballers
Derby County F.C. players
Morecambe F.C. players
Kendal Town F.C. players
Northern Premier League players
Association football midfielders